St Augustine's was a parliamentary constituency in Kent.  It returned one Member of Parliament to the House of Commons of the Parliament of the United Kingdom.

The constituency was created for the 1885 general election, and abolished for the 1918 general election.

Boundaries
The Sessional Divisions of Elham, Home and Wingham, the Municipal Boroughs of Canterbury, Deal, Dover, Folkestone and Hythe and the corporate town of Fordwich, Bekesbourne, Ringwold, Kingsdown and Walmer.

History
In its 33-year existence this constituency only ever elected two Members of Parliament, both Conservatives; its first MP was the former Home Secretary, Aretas Akers-Douglas.

Members of Parliament

Election results

Elections in the 1880s

Elections in the 1890s

Elections in the 1900s

Elections in the 1910s

General Election 1914–15:

Another General Election was required to take place before the end of 1915. The political parties had been making preparations for an election to take place and by the July 1914, the following candidates had been selected; 
Unionist: Ronald McNeill
Liberal: Hubert Townsend

References

Parliamentary constituencies in Kent (historic)
Constituencies of the Parliament of the United Kingdom established in 1885
Constituencies of the Parliament of the United Kingdom disestablished in 1918